Arséma Angela Adeoluwayemi Thomas is an American-born actor. She plays young Agatha Danbury in the Netflix series Queen Charlotte: A Bridgerton Story (2023).

Early life and career
Thomas was born in Atlanta, Georgia to Ethiopian and Nigerian diplomats. She lived in multiple countries growing up, including the Comoros, Uganda, Kenya, Togo and Benin, as well as India. She speaks English, French, Spanish, Yoruba and Amharic.

Thomas completed high school at Linden Hall. She initially planned to pursue a "safe career" and go into global public health, graduating with a Bachelor of Arts in Biophysics from Carnegie Mellon University in 2016 and then a Master of Public Health from Yale University in 2018. She gave a TEDx talk and founded the health app Enki (stylised as enki).

However, after losing her father to Lou Gehrig's disease, Thomas decided to pursue acting. She took short courses at the American Academy of Dramatic Arts, the Cours Florent in Paris, and the Royal Academy of Dramatic Art (RADA) in London. She went on to graduate with a Master of Fine Arts in Professional Acting from the London Academy of Music and Dramatic Art (LAMDA) in 2022.

In 2020, Thomas participated in online Shakespeare readings with the Market Theatre in Johannesburg. After signing with her agent in South Africa, Thomas landed her debut feature film role as Rebecca in Redeeming Love, which premiered in 2022. Also in 2022, it was announced Thomas would play young Lady Danbury (played by Adjoa Andoh later in life) in the upcoming Netflix period drama prequel Queen Charlotte: A Bridgerton Story.

Filmography

References

External links
 

Living people
Alumni of the London Academy of Music and Dramatic Art
American people of Nigerian descent
American people of Ethiopian descent
Carnegie Mellon University alumni
People from Atlanta
Yale University alumni
Year of birth missing (living people)